Visual Neuroscience is a peer-reviewed scientific journal covering experimental and theoretical research in basic visual neuroscience. The editor-in-chief is Paul R Martin of the University of Sydney.

According to the Journal Citation Reports, Visual Neuroscience had a 2019 impact factor of 3, placing it 139th out of 271 in the neurosciences and 13th out of 60 for ophthalmology.

External links
 Official website

Vision
Neuroscience journals
Perception journals
Cambridge University Press academic journals